Kwai Hing is an elevated railway station on the  of Hong Kong MTR system.

Opened on 10 May 1982, it forced most direct bus services into Kowloon to be cancelled. Nevertheless, the station provides a convenient transport service to local residents, also attracting local shuttle services with nearby settlements and factories.

Below the platforms is a small transport interchange. This interchange is saturated with traffic, due to traffic diverted from the increasingly crowded Kwai Fong station.

History
Kwai Hing station opened on 10 May 1982, in sync with Tsuen Wan line. There has been no new changes since, other than the fitting of Platform Screen Doors.

Station layout

The tracks of platform 1 and 2 are located side by side in the middle of the station. Unlike the island platforms common to most MTR stations, Kwai Hing uses two side platforms and passengers have to ride different escalators from the concourse up to the correct platform for the destination they wish to go to.

Kwai Hing station is one of the three elevated stations on the Tsuen Wan line. The structure of Kwai Hing station is very similar to that of Kwai Fong station.

Entrances/Exits
A: Kwai Hing Estate, Kwai Hing Road, Millennium Trade Centre, Kwai Chung Centre, Kwai Chun Court
B: Transport Interchange, Kwai Hing Government Offices 
C: Kwai Hong Court 
D: Sun Kwai Hing Gardens
E: Kowloon Commerce Centre

References

Kwai Chung
MTR stations in the New Territories
Tsuen Wan line
Railway stations in Hong Kong opened in 1982
1982 establishments in Hong Kong